Valley City High School is a public high school located in Valley City, North Dakota. It is a part of the Valley City Public School District system. The school athletic teams are known as the Hi-Liners.

Athletics

Championships
State Class 'A' boys' basketball: 1918, 1920, 1921, 1929, 1945, 1960
State Class 'A' football: 1907, 1924, 1936
State Class 'A' boys' track and field: 1909
State Class 'A' girls' track and field: 1971, 1973, 1974
State Class 'A' speech: 1994, 1995, 1999, 2006, 2017,2018,2019,2021
State Class 'A' cross country: 2001
State boys' tennis: 1970
State Class ‘B’ boys' golf: 2010

Notable alumni
 Jeff Boschee, coach and former professional basketball player
 Earl Pomeroy, US Congressman

References

External links
Valley City Junior/Senior High School
Valley City Public Schools

Public high schools in North Dakota
North Dakota High School Activities Association (Class A)
North Dakota High School Activities Association (Class AA Football)
Schools in Barnes County, North Dakota
Public middle schools in North Dakota